Themistoklis Konitsas of Ioannis (Arachova, 1901 – Athens, 20 November 1980) was a Greek lawyer and politician. He acted as MP in the Boeotia constituency and as Undersecretary.

References 

20th-century Greek lawyers
National and Kapodistrian University of Athens alumni
People from Boeotia
1901 births
1980 deaths
Greek MPs 1935–1936
Greek MPs 1936
Greek MPs 1946–1950
Greek MPs 1951–1952
Greek MPs 1952–1956
Greek MPs 1956–1958
Greek MPs 1958–1961
Greek MPs 1961–1963
Greek MPs 1974–1977